Griseargiolestes eboracus is a species of Australian damselfly in the family Megapodagrionidae,
commonly known as a grey-chested flatwing. 
It is endemic to eastern Australia, where it inhabits bogs.

Griseargiolestes eboracus is a medium-sized damselfly, black-green metallic in colour with yellow markings; adults have pruinescence on the body, but not the tail.
Like other members of the family Megapodagrionidae, it rests with its wings outspread.

Griseargiolestes eboracus appears similar to Griseargiolestes griseus which is found south of the Hunter River in New South Wales.

Gallery

See also
 List of Odonata species of Australia

References 

Megapodagrionidae
Odonata of Australia
Insects of Australia
Endemic fauna of Australia
Taxa named by Robert John Tillyard
Insects described in 1913
Damselflies